Candeias may refer to:

Places in Brazil
Candeias, Bahia, municipality in the state of Bahia
Candeias, Minas Gerais, municipality in the state of Minas Gerais
Candeias do Jamari, municipality in the state of Rondônia

People with the surname
Daniel Candeias, Portuguese footballer

Other uses
Grupo Candeias, Capoeira group
Candeias River, river of Rondônia

See also
Preto de Candeias River, river of Rondônia